Tievebaun, also known as Taobh Bán ("White side") in Irish, is a mountain located in County Leitrim. Its classifications include: "Arderin" & "Vandeleur-Lynam". The mountain is most notable for its cliffs as well as the pinnacles which are located on the eastern and northern sides, such as Eagle's Rock and The Hag’s Leap.

Tievebaun is the third highest mountain in the Dartry Mountains range, and ranked as the 254th highest mountain in Ireland.

References

Mountains and hills of County Leitrim